Palikije Drugie  is a village in the administrative district of Gmina Wojciechów, within Lublin County, Lublin Voivodeship, in eastern Poland. It has a population of approximately 100 people, with 37 households.

References

Villages in Lublin County